This is a list of '''Hardin–Simmons Cowboys football players in the NFL Draft.

Key

Selections
Source:

References

Lists of National Football League draftees by college football team

Hardin–Simmons Cowboys NFL Draft